Graikochori is a village in the district of Thesprotia in Epirus, Greece. It is within the Igoumenitsa municipality. In the 2011 census the village had a population of 1,904 inhabitants.

References 

Populated places in Thesprotia